Since its establishment in 1947, Pakistan has been involved in numerous armed conflicts both locally and around the world. The main focus of its military operations have both historically and currently been on neighbouring India—against whom Pakistan has fought four major wars in addition to commonly-recurring border skirmishes and standoffs. The two nations have had a hostile and turbulent relationship since their independence from the United Kingdom and subsequent war over the Himalayan region of Jammu and Kashmir. Both India and Pakistan claim Kashmir in its entirety but have not exercised control over the entire region, which remains divided and contested between the two states by the Line of Control. The Kashmir conflict has seen extensive—albeit unsuccessful—intervention and mediation by the United Nations.

Pakistan has also had a turbulent relationship with neighbouring Afghanistan, characterized by armed border skirmishes and periods of diplomatic tension. The Pakistani government has increased military activity along the Afghanistan–Pakistan border and built a border barrier to crack down on illegal immigration, militancy, and smuggling.

Outside of its home region of South Asia, Pakistan has also engaged in international conflicts in the Middle East and Africa as part of larger coalitions, and remains one of the largest contributors of troops to various United Nations peacekeeping missions. The country was designated as a major non-NATO ally by the United States in 2004, and has participated extensively in the American-led War on Terror following the 9/11 attacks.

See also
 Other military conflicts involving Pakistan:
 Kashmir conflict
 Operation Desert Hawk
 2001–2002 India–Pakistan standoff
 2008 Indo-Pakistani standoff
 India–Pakistan border skirmishes (disambiguation)
 Afghanistan–Pakistan skirmishes
 2017 Afghanistan–Pakistan border skirmish
 2008-12 Pakistan–United States skirmishes

References

Pakistan
 
Military history of Pakistan
Wars
Wars